Paradise Park Natural Area is a natural area in Rocky Mountain National Park, Colorado, several miles east of Grand Lake. It protects  the upper Paradise Creek basin, encompassing several alpine lakes, alpine meadows, and virgin spruce-fir forest. Paradise Creek contains pure strains of Colorado River cutthroat trout. The area is also adjacent to the Hell Canyon Natural Area in the Indian Peaks wilderness.

See also
 List of Colorado Natural Areas

References

Protected areas of Grand County, Colorado
Protected areas established in 1983